Vida Nueva may refer to:

Periodicals
Vida Nueva (:es:Vida Nueva), defunct Spanish literary magazine
Vida Nueva (:ca:Vida Nueva), Catholic periodical started in Spain
Vida Nueva, (:es:Vida nueva) Spanish trade union magazine
Vida Nueva, The Tidings
Vida Nueva, Chihuahua periodical Francisco Lagos Cházaro

Organisations
Via Nueva, Costa Rican NGO supported by Austrian Social Service

Music
Vida Nueva (Los Freddy's album)
Vida Nueva, album by Funky 2007
Vida Nueva, album by Justo Lamas
"Vida Nueva", song by Río Roma composed by José Luis Roma 
"Vida Nueva", song by Reyli Barba composed by R. Barba

See also
Nueva Vida (disambiguation)